The Occitania women's national football team is the football team of Occitania, which is the name given to areas of southern France, westernmost Italy and a small valley in northern Spain where the Occitan language is spoken. It is controlled by the Associacion Occitania de Fotbol.

Occitania also play in the Europeada, which is organised by the Federal Union of European Nationalities (FUEN). In the Europeada 2016 Occitania reached the final, being eliminated by eventual tournament winner South Tyrol. In the 2016 tournament and lost after extra time, finishing 2nd out of 6 teams.

Tournament records

Europeada record

World Cup record

Results and upcoming fixtures

Personalities of the team

Current squad

Squad for the Europeada 2016

Squad for the Europeada 2020

Managers

References

External links
Official Website - includes game summaries and rosters (in Occitan)
Facebook Page
Youtube Channel
ConIFA member
FUEN member
ConIFA presenting Occitania

European national and official selection-teams not affiliated to FIFA
Occitania
Football teams in France